Mlaka is a village in central Croatia, in the municipality of Jasenovac, Sisak-Moslavina County. It is a new territorial organization that has been formed from the former large municipality of Novska.

History
Mlaka was the location of a Croatian concentration camp during World War II in this area. Mlaka and the nearby village of Jablanac Jasenovački were locations of forced labor of inmates of the Jasenovac concentration camp, after the population of the villages themselves was interned in the camp or forcibly transferred elsewhere. Inmates were also executed there, and five mass graves have been identified in and around Mlaka.

Demographics
According to the 2011 census, the village of Mlaka has 58 inhabitants. This represents 16.76% of its population prior to the Croatian War of Independence (1991–95).

According to the 1991 census, 304 residents were ethnic Serbs (84.91%), 10 ethnic Croats (2.79%), 10 Yugoslavs (2.79%), 2 Muslims (0.55%), and others (8.92%).

Sights 
 Monument and memorial to the victims of the Jasenovac concentration camp

Notable natives and residents

References

Populated places in Sisak-Moslavina County
Serb communities in Croatia